Filicium decipiens, called the ferntree, fern tree or fern leaf tree, is a species of Filicium found in east Africa, Madagascar, India and Sri Lanka. It is planted as an ornamental tree in the Indian subcontinent, Indonesia, Hawaii, and elsewhere.

References

decipiens
Ornamental trees